Mohamed "Kesto" Haleem,: މުޙައްމަދު ހަލީމް ),born on September 14, 1964, is the founder of Muscle load  Gymnasium and the co-founder of BodyBuilding Federation of Maldives(BBFM). He is a Maldivian entrepreneur well known for the introduction of Bodybuilding in Maldives.

Biography
Mohamed Haleem, (September 14, 1964) is the founder of Muscle load Gymnasium.. He opened his personal gymnasium to the public in 1993. In 1997, Mohamed Haleem's father and his friend M W Deen founded the Bodybuilding Federation of Maldives (BBFM) later changed to Bodybuilding Association of Maldives. Kesto, replaced his father as the Vice-Chairman of the BBFM after his death in 2001. 
Mohamed Haleem is a founder member of:
Bodybuilding Federation of Maldives
Commonwealth Bodybuilding federation
South Asian Bodybuilding and fitness Federation
World Bodybuilding and Physique Sports Federation.

And Also a member of Asian Body Building Federation.

Early life
Haleem began his education at Montessori School, Malé. He then joined Majeediyya School to complete his secondary education. Haleem worked as a Deputy Immigration Officer of Maldives for 13 years.

Awards

Certificate of Merit (IFBB) for promoting Bodybuilding and Fitness among Maldivians
Bronze Medal (IFBB) for promoting Bodybuilding and Fitness among Maldivians from Ben Weider
Silver Medal (IFBB) for promoting Bodybuilding and Fitness among Maldivians
Silver Medal (IFBB) for promoting Bodybuilding and Fitness among South Asian region from Paul Chua
ABBF 50th Anniversary Diamond pin

References

External links
 https://about.me/kesto
 Muscle Load Official Website for interest in bodybuilding, health and fitness
https://web.archive.org/web/20160304060859/http://www.haveeru.com.mv/english/details/1133/Maldives_bodybuilders_beef_up_with_three_silvers_
http://www.maalefitnessclub.com/shaheen-wins-gold-at-abbf-2017/

1964 births
Living people
Bodybuilders
Maldivian Muslims
Maldivian businesspeople
People from Malé